Cowen may refer to:

 Cowen (surname)
 Cowen, West Virginia, in the United States
 Cowen Group, the holding company for Cowen and Company, LLC, a U.S.-based Investment Bank

See also 
 
 Cowan (disambiguation)